The Paris March for Life is an annual demonstration protesting abortion held in Paris in late January, close to the anniversary date of the 1975 law that legalized abortion in France. The event was created in 2005 by several French anti-abortion organizations the thirtieth year of legal abortion which it is opposed to. It defines itself as non-denominational and non-partisan.

Over the years, the Paris March for Life has become the largest annual anti-abortion gathering in Europe. Estimates of the number of marchers in 2008 range from 2,500 to 20,000. The rally attracts delegations from European countries other than France, notably Italy, Spain, Belgium, the UK, Poland, Switzerland, Germany and Ireland.

2010 saw a sharp rise in attendance, possibly as high as 25,000, compared to 15,000 in 2009. These numbers have since increased to 50,000 in 2017.

See also
March for Life and Family (Warsaw, Poland)
March for Life (Washington, D.C., U.S.A.)
March for Life (Prague)
Walk for Life West Coast (San Francisco, Calif., U.S.A.)

References

External links

Paris March for Life official website

Abortion in France
Conservatism in France
Culture of Paris
Anti-abortion movement
Protest marches
Protests in France
Annual events in Paris
Annual protests
Recurring events established in 2005
2005 establishments in France
Paris